The MacLean Brothers are a world record holding rowing team from Scotland.

The brothers Ewan, Jamie and Lachlan MacLean hold the records for being the first brother team to row any ocean, the youngest team of three, and the fastest team of three to row the Atlantic (35 days, 9 hours, 9 minutes). The brothers placed third overall in the 2019 Talisker Whisky Atlantic Challenge.

The MacLean brothers, who are also known as BROAR (a combination of the words brother and oar) sailed from La Gomera, in the Canary Islands on 12 December 2019 and completed the 3,000-mile trip to Antigua on 17 January 2020. The previous record for rowing the Atlantic Ocean was 41 days, set by Rob Hamill and Phil Stubbs.

The MacLean brothers are the sons of Sheila and Charlie MacLean from Edinburgh.

The 2020 record-breaking row raised  money for Children 1st and Feedback Madagascar.

References 

Living people
Ocean rowers
Rowing in Scotland
Year of birth missing (living people)